Glaudi Barsotti (also spelled Claudi Barsòtti in Occitan or Claude Barsotti in French) is an Occitan writer and journalist born in Marseille.

Selected works
 A flor e mesura, cronicas d'un jornalista, 1963
 Lo lop en Occitània, 1964
 Antologia deis escrivans sociaus provençaus (1875 a 1914), 1975
 La tèrra deis autres, roman, Vent Terral, 1979
 Le music-hall marseillais de 1815 a 1914, 1984
 Parlam provençau (obratge collectiu), 1971
 Un sègle de premsa occitana a Marselha de 1840 a 1940, 1981-1982
 Cronicas, 1990
 Bestiari d'Occitània, Lexic latin-occitan provençau-francés dei vertebrats d'Occitània, IEO Sector Recèrca, 1992 (255 p.).
 Un papier sensa importància, novel, IEO, 1994
 Le bouil et le tian: la cuisine du terroir provençal, 1996, Ais de Provença, Edisud
 Testimòni d'un niston de la guèrra, autobiografia, IEO, 2002, 
 L'estraç, novel, IEO, 2002, 
 Lo comunard de la Mitidjà, novel, IEO, 

Occitan-language writers
Living people
Year of birth missing (living people)